Lance Victor George Haggith  (born 14 May 1960 in Watford, England) is the founder of the Sports Traider charity in the UK, and winner of the 2010 BBC Sports Personality of the Year Unsung Hero award. He was a Royal Navy reservist for 6 years, and a National League basketball player and coach.

Honours and awards
Haggith was appointed Officer of the Order of the British Empire (OBE) in the 2022 Birthday Honours for charitable and voluntary services to vulnerable people, particularly during Covid-19.

2001 Royal Humane Society award for bravery for rescuing a girl from a burning car 
2009 Nat West New Business of the Year winner 
2010 BBC Sports Personality of the Year winner Unsung Hero
2011 Big Society Award winner from David Cameron, Prime Minister of the United Kingdom 
2012 Olympic torch bearer 
2012 Big Venture winner
2017 Honorary Doctor of Science (outstanding services to sport), University of Bedford

Founder

Lance of London
BCP
Sports Traider charity
Hoops Aid
Sports£Land
BounceBack
Golf Aid
Designer of the calpol sachet and packbuster
Boxing Aid
Puck Aid

References

Living people
1960 births
Sportspeople from Watford
English basketball coaches
Officers of the Order of the British Empire
Royal Naval Reserve personnel